The 2007 Vuelta al Táchira was held from 7  to 21 January 2007 in Venezuela. It was a multiple stage road cycling race that took part over seven stages with a total of over 1600 kilometres.

Colombian Hernán Buenahora edged his Gobernación del Zulia – Alcaldía de Cabimas teammate and defending champion Manuel Medina. Medina won the mountains classification and Venezuelan Jackson Rodríguez of Loteria Del Táchira-Banfoandes captured the points classification.

Men's stage summary

Men's top 10 overall

References
 Official website

2007
2007 in road cycling
2007 in Venezuelan sport